Thyatira mexicana is a moth in the family Drepanidae. It was described by Henry Edwards in 1884. It is found in the US state of Arizona through Central America (Mexico, Costa Rica, Panama) to South America (Bolivia, Peru).

The wingspan is about 35 mm.

References

Moths described in 1884
Thyatirinae